Marian Eugen Căpăţână (born 18 June 1986) is a Romanian rugby union footballer. He plays the position of Hooker.

He played for Steaua București during the 2011/12 season. He has been playing for Timișoara Saracens since 2012, in the SuperLiga. He also played for București Wolves.

He has 18 caps for Romania, since 2012, with 2 tries scored, 10 points on aggregate. He has won a European Champion Trophy. He was called for the 2015 Rugby World Cup, but was not capped.

References

External links

 Eugen Căpățână at Timișoara Saracens website

1986 births
Living people
București Wolves players
CSA Steaua București (rugby union) players
SCM Rugby Timișoara players
Romanian rugby union players
Rugby union hookers
People from Balș
Romania international rugby union players